Franz Sebastian Seiler (1810 – 4 December 1890) was a German, an associate of Wilhelm Weitling, a Swiss reformer. He was a journalist on the Rheinische Zeitung and a member of the Brussels Communist Correspondence Committee in 1846. Seiler was "a stenographer to the French National Assembly in 1848 and 1849." He joined the Communist League and took part in the 1848-1849 revolution in Germany. Following the suppression of that revolution, Seiler escaped to London, England in the 1850s. From 1859-1860 he was the editor of the Deutsche Zeitung, and he started a weekly paper in 1860, The New Orleans Journal. Seiler later worked for Negro suffrage.

References

External links
 
Pseudonyms of Sebastian Seiler, German National Library
New Orleans Journal, published by Sebastian Seiler
"The famous author of "Kaspar Hauser", letter by Karl Marx
 Kaspar Hauser, der Thronerber Badens, by Sebastian Seiler. Paris, 1845.
 Das Complot vom 13. Juni 1849 oder der letzte Sieg der Bourgeoisie in Frankreich: ein Beitrag zur Geschichte der Gegenwart, by Sebastian Seiler
 Het complot van 13 juni 1849 of de laatste overwinning van de bourgeoisie in Frankrijk, Een bijdrage aan de hedendaagse geschiedenis, by Sebastian Seiler

1810 births
1890 deaths
German journalists
German male journalists
Journalists from Louisiana
Writers from New Orleans
German-American Forty-Eighters
German socialists
German revolutionaries
19th-century American journalists
American male journalists
19th-century German writers
19th-century German male writers
19th-century American male writers